The Greece national handball team is the national handball team of Greece and is controlled by the Hellenic Handball Federation.

Greece has a long tradition in handball. First of all, Greece made it to the handball 2005 World Cup and the 2004 Olympics where they beat Brazil, Korea and won against Egypt in a close game. In the Olympics they lost to eventual champions Croatia, and finished sixth in the tournament. In the World Cup they finished in the sixth position as well.

Competitive record

Olympic Games

World Championships

European Championships

Current squad
Greek squad at the 2023 World Championship Qualification

External links

IHF profile

Men's national handball teams
Handball in Greece
Handball